Amity is an unincorporated community in Comanche County, in the U.S. state of Texas.

History
The area in what is known as Amity today was first settled in the 1870s. The first grave in the community's cemetery was placed in 1877. The community got the name Amity because of the friendly relations of the locals. There was a church, a cemetery, and several scattered houses in Amity in 1940. There was hardly any change in 1966, but the church continued to operate in 1992 and the community continues to be listed on county maps.

Geography

Education
Amity had its own school from 1902 to 1906. Today, the community is served by the May Independent School District.

References

Unincorporated communities in Texas
Unincorporated communities in Comanche County, Texas